The Narrow Valley is a 1921 British silent drama film directed by Cecil Hepworth. As of August 2010, the film is missing from the BFI National Archive, and is listed as one of the British Film Institute's "75 Most Wanted" lost films.

Cast
 Alma Taylor as Victoria
 George Dewhurst as Jerry Hawkins
 James Carew as Eli Jones
 Hugh Clifton as Richard Jones
 Gwynne Herbert as Ursula Jones
 Lottie Blackford as Miss Pine

See also
 List of lost films

References

External links
BFI 75 Most Wanted entry, with extensive notes

1921 films
1921 lost films
1921 romantic drama films
British romantic drama films
British silent feature films
British black-and-white films
Films directed by Cecil Hepworth
Hepworth Pictures films
Lost British films
Lost romantic drama films
1920s British films
Silent romantic drama films